Urosalpinx is a genus of sea snails, marine gastropods in the subfamily Ocenebrinae  of the  murex snail family, Muricidae.

Description
The shell is elongated oval, or short fusiform, longitudinally ribbed or undulated and spirally striated. The aperture has a short siphonal canal. The outer lip is dentate and lirate within. The operculum is somewhat like that of Purpura, semicordate, with the nucleus at the outer edge a little below the middle. Lingual dentition nearly like that of Trophon, the lateral teeth having an elongated base of attachment but the rhachidian tooth has numerous minute denticles between the principal ones, corresponding to ridges on the surface of the tooth, as in the Murices. Ova-capsules are oblong, shouldered, widest near the summit, compressed, carinated on either side peduncle short. The base of the attachment is very small. The aperture is median at the summit.

Species
 † Urosalpinx archipatagonica Ihering 1907 

 † Urosalpinx aspinosus (Meyer, 1886 ) 
 † Urosalpinx auroraensis E.J. Petuch, 1994  
 † Urosalpinx baudoni (Morlet, 1888) 
 † Urosalpinx boggsi H.A. Pilsbry & A.A. Olsson, 1941  
 Urosalpinx cala (Pilsbry, 1897)
 Urosalpinx cinerea (Say, 1822)
 † Urosalpinx coombsi Durham 1944
 † Urosalpinx cossmanni A.E. Ortmann, 1900 
 † Urosalpinx curtansata R. Tate, 1888 
 † Urosalpinx cymioides H.A. Pilsbry & A.A. Olsson, 1941  
 † Urosalpinx dalli (J. Brown & H.A. Pilsbry, 1911)  
 † Urosalpinx dautzembergi (Ihering, 1897) 
 Urosalpinx devriesi Houart & Sellanes, 2017
 † Urosalpinx ecuadorensis H.A. Pilsbry & A.A. Olsson, 1941 
 † Urosalpinx gilmorei E.J. Petuch, 1994 
 Urosalpinx haneti (Petit de la Saussaye, 1856)
 † Urosalpinx kirbyi Clark 1938
 Urosalpinx lancellottii Houart & Sellanes, 2017
 Urosalpinx macra A.E. Verrill, 1884 (nomen dubium) 
 † Urosalpinx mengeana W.H. Dall, 1890  
 † Urosalpinx miamiensis E.J. Petuch, 1994  
 † Urosalpinx ortmanni Ihering,1907
 † Urosalpinx rucksorum E.J. Petuch, 1994  
 † Urosalpinx rusticus (T.A. Conrad, 1839)  
 Urosalpinx stimpsoni   Dall, 1927
 Urosalpinx subangulata (Stearns, 1873)
 † Urosalpinx subrusticus d'Orbigny 1852
 † Urosalpinx trossula (Conrad, 1832)
 Urosalpinx verrilli Dall, 1927
Species brought into synonymy
 Urosalpinx badia (A. Adams, 1863): synonym of Searlesia badia (A. Adams, 1863)
 Urosalpinx bandana Schepman, 1911: synonym of Ergalatax contracta'' (Reeve, 1846) 
 † Urosalpinx bonneti Cossmann, 1913: synonym of † Trophonopsis bonneti (Cossmann, 1913)  (superseded combination)
 Urosalpinx carolinensis A. E. Verrill, 1884: synonym of Mohnia carolinensis (A. E. Verrill, 1884) (original combination)
 Urosalpinx cinereus (Say, 1822): synonym of Urosalpinx cinerea (Say, 1822) (incorrect grammatical agreement of specific epithet)
 Urosalpinx circumtexta (Stearns, 1871): synonym of Paciocinebrina circumtexta (Stearns, 1871)
 † Urosalpinx cuisense Cossmann, 1913: synonym of † Trophonopsis cuisensis (Cossmann, 1913) (superseded combination)
 † Urosalpinx defossum (Pilkington, 1804): synonym of † Trophonopsis sublamellosa (Deshayes, 1835) 
 Urosalpinx floridana Conrad, 1869: synonym of Calotrophon ostrearum (Conrad, 1846) 
 Urosalpinx fusulus (Brocchi, 1814): synonym of Orania fusulus (Brocchi, 1814)
 Urosalpinx grippi (Dall, 1911): synonym of Paciocinebrina grippi (Dall, 1911)
 Urosalpinx heptagonalis (Reeve, 1846): synonym of Ergalatax heptagonalis (Reeve, 1846)
 Urosalpinx hupeanus Ihering, 1907: synonym of Fuegotrophon pallidus (Broderip, 1833) 
 Urosalpinx innotabilis E. A. Smith, 1879: synonym of Ergalatax contracta (Reeve, 1846)
 Urosalpinx perrugata (Conrad, 1846): synonym of Vokesinotus perrugatus (Conrad, 1846) ( combination)
 Urosalpinx rushi [sic]: synonym of Urosalpinx haneti (Petit de la Saussaye, 1856) (misspelling)
 Urosalpinx rushii Pilsbry, 1897: synonym of Urosalpinx haneti (Petit de la Saussaye, 1856)
 Urosalpinx scrobiculata (Dunker, 1846) : synonym of Vaughtia scrobiculata (Dunker, 1846)
 Urosalpinx smithi Schepman, 1911: synonym of Ergalatax contracta (Reeve, 1846)
 Urosalpinx sperata (Cossmann, 1921): synonym of Gracilipurpura sperata (Cossmann, 1921)
 Urosalpinx subsinuatus (Maltzan, 1884): synonym of Trachypollia turricula'' (Maltzan, 1884)
 Urosalpinx tampaensis (Conrad, 1846): synonym of Eupleura tampaensis (Conrad, 1846)
 Urosalpinx walkeri G. B. Sowerby III, 1908: synonym of Orania walkeri (G. B. Sowerby III, 1908) (original combination)

References

 J. W. Durham. 1944. Megafaunal zones of the Oligocene of northwestern Washington. University of California Publications in Geological Sciences 27:101 -212
 J. R. Gardner. 1947. The Molluscan Fauna of the Alum Bluff Group of Florida. United States Geological Survey Professional Paper (142A-H)1-709
 J. A. Gardner. 1948. Mollusca from the Miocene and Lower Pliocene of Virginia and North Carolina: Part 2. Scaphopoda and Gastropoda. United States Geological Survey Professional Paper 199(B):179-310 
 A. Gazdzicki and H. Pugaczewska. 1984. Biota of the "Pecten Conglomerate" (Polenez Cove Formation, Pliocene) of King George Island (South Shetland Islands, Antarctica). Studia Geologica Polonica 79:59-120
 A. J. W. Hendy, D. P. Buick, K. V. Bulinski, C. A. Ferguson, and A. I. Miller. 2008. Unpublished census data from Atlantic coastal plain and circum-Caribbean Neogene assemblages and taxonomic opinions.
 G. C. Martin. 1904. Gastropoda. Maryland Geological Survey Miocene(Text):131-269 
 J. J. Sepkoski. 2002. A compendium of fossil marine animal genera. Bulletins of American Paleontology 363:1-560 
 J. A. Todd. 2001. Systematic list of gastropods in the Panama Paleontology Project collections.
 L. W. Ward. 1992. Molluscan biostratigraphy of the Miocene Middle Atlantic Coastal Plain of North America. Virginia Museum of Natural History 2
 L. W. Ward and B.W. Blackwelder. 1987. Late Pliocene and Early Pleistocene Mollusca from the James City and Chowan River Formations at Lee Creek Mine. Smithsonian Contributions to Paleobiology 61:113-283

External links
 Stimpson W. 1865. On certain genera and families of zoophagous gasteropods. American Journal of Conchology, 1: 55-64, pl. 8-9
 Barco, A.; Herbert, G.; Houart, R.; Fassio, G. & Oliverio, M. (2017). A molecular phylogenetic framework for the subfamily Ocenebrinae (Gastropoda, Muricidae). Zoologica Scripta. 46 (3): 322-335.

 
Ocenebrinae